The Governor of Kyiv Oblast or officially, the Chairman of the Kyiv Oblast State Administration is the chairman of the executive branch of Kyiv Oblast, a province in northern Ukraine. The official residence is located in the country's capital, Kyiv. 

In mass media, the office is majorly overshadowed by a head of the Kyiv City State Administration.

Authority
According to Chapter VI of the constitution, the office of governor is appointed by the president, on recommendation from the cabinet of ministers, to serve a four-year term of office. The Oblast's council can express a motion of no confidence to the governor, after which the Ukrainian president is to issue a "substantiated reply." However, if two-thirds of the oblast council's deputies pass a resolution of no confidence in the governor, the president must adopt a decision on the governor's resignation.

As part of the constitutional reform in Ukraine, President Petro Poroshenko proposed abolishing the office of chairmen of the regional state administrations, and instead replace them with the office of the Representative of the President of Ukraine which will be appointed in each of Ukraine's 24 oblasts. These representatives will have significantly less authority over the regions in which they serve, instead being appointed to oversee the authority and constitutionality of Ukraine's administrative units.

List of governors
Until the fall of the Soviet Union in 1991, most of the authority in Kyiv Oblast belonged to the Kyiv Regional Committee of the Communist Party of Ukraine. The following is a full list of the leaders of Kyiv Oblast from 1932 until the present day.

Representative of the President 
 Ivan Kapshtyk (1992–1994)
 in 1994–1995 the office was liquidated and its duties temporarily transferred to chairman of the regional council executive committee

Heads of the Oblast State Administration 
 Vasyl Sinko (1995—1996)
 Anatolii Zasukha (1996—2005)
 Yevhen Zhovtyak (2005—2006)
 Valeriy Kondruk (2006) (acting)
 Vira Ulianchenko (2006—2009)
 Viktor Vakarash (2009—2010)
 Anatolii Prysyazhnyuk (2010–2014) 
 Volodymyr Shandra (since 2 March 2014 — 27 January 2016)
 Maksym Melnychuk (3 February 2016 — 9 September 2016)
 Lev Partzkhaladze (acting) (9 September 2016 — 28 October 2016)
 Oleksandr Horhan (28 October 2016 — 30 October 2018)
 Oleksandr Tereschuk (30 October 2018 — 11 June 2019)
 Vyacheslav Kucher (acting) (11 June 2019 — 9 July 2019)
 Mykhailo Bno-Airiian (10 July 2019 — 28 October 2019)
 Oleksiy Chernyshov (28 October 2019 – 4 March 2020)
Vasyl Volodin (18 June 2020 — 8 February 2022)
Oleksiy Kuleba (8 February 2022 — 15 March 2022) 
Oleksandr Pavlyuk (15 March 2022 — 21 May 2022)
Oleksiy Kuleba (21 May 2022 — 24 January 2023)
Dymtro Nazarekno (acting) (2023 -)

Notes

See also
 Kyiv City State Administration

References

External links
 

 
Kiev Oblast
Kyiv Oblast